Egmond Castle , also called the Ruins of Egmond, is a ruined medieval castle in the Dutch province of North Holland. The castle dates from the 11th century and is the ancestral seat of the Egmond family, whose members became sovereign Dukes of Guelders, Counts of Egmond and Princes of Gavere, Counts of Buren and Leerdam. It is a
national monument of the Netherlands.

History

Origins 
The origins of Egmond Castle is closely connected to Egmond Abbey, which was founded by the counts of Holland in Egmond-Binnen. When the Abbey lands became too large, the abbot decided to appoint a certain Berwout as steward of these estates in 1129. Berwout and his descendants lived in a (fortified) farm or manor ("Hoeve") north of the abbey. As Berwout and his descendants took part in the crusades, they were rewarded with the hereditary lordship over Egmond.

First Castle | c. 1100–1203 
Little is known about the first castle of the Lords of Egmond. In the 1930s Wouter Braat discovered that under the later main castle, there were signs of previous habitation. He found remains of an old palisade, and also some very heavy oak piles, with burned heads. Jaap Renaud thought it possible and tempting to consider these to be remains of the first castle. It is not known when the first castle was built. Some say this was in about 1050. Others say it was in 1150. 

It is an interesting question whether the first version of Egmond Castle was a Motte-and-bailey castle. This hypotheses could include that the motte was lowered, and that this explains the absence of debris and building remains on the site of the later round water castle. Renaud and P. Beelaerts van Blokland saw no pressing reasons to suppose that a motte had existed on that site.

Walter I, Lord of Egmond, nicknamed  got involved in the Loon war, a war of succession over the County of Holland (and its dependency Zeeland) from 1203 until 1206, brought on by the death of count Dirk VII. During this war, the faction of Louis II, Count of Loon set the fortified manor on fire in 1205.

Second Castle | 1206–c.1300 

Walter I or his successor decided to build a circular stone castle as a replacement. 

The second castle was a round water castle. It formed a far from perfect circle, with a minimum diameter of 27 meters, and a maximum diameter of 29 meters. The curtain wall was 0.76-1 m thick, and stood in the moat. There were buttresses on the inside, which stood left a space of 3.20-4 m between them. These spaces were spanned by arcs that supported a circular walkway. On the south side there was a strong tower house which probably doubled as a gatehouse. Later a smaller, but strong tower was added on the northeast side. The smaller and lighter tower on the northwest side was also a later addition. 

The main purpose of the circular castle was to serve as a place for refuge and defense in times of peril. No traces of buildings were found inside the circular castle. The main living and residential buildings Therefore have to be sought on what was then the outer bailey. Egmond castle was first mentioned in 1228.

The church next to the castle was started at the same time as the round water castle. Renaud deduced this from the used brick. The oldest was 29-31 * 14.5 * 8 cm and therefore the church was also from the early thirteenth century. Later brick used in the church was like that used in the second phase of the third castle.

There is a single source that claims that Egmond Castle was destroyed in 1315. If such were true, the circular castle would have been destroyed that year. Renaud thought it more likely that this happened during the rebellions after the death of Count Floris V. In both cases a wall fragment retrieved in the northwest moat could be a leftover of the destruction. The distance between the round castle, and the new  (third) castle makes it likely that the round castle lost its use in about 1300. The existence of the circular water castle was then forgotten till it was rediscovered in the 1930s. See: 18th century floor plan.

Third Castle - First Building Phase | first half 14th century 

The third castle was constructed in two phases. It was built on what is supposed to have been the outer bailey of the old circular castle. It also replaced this castle. The former outer bailey was divided into a western and eastern side. The first phase saw the construction of a new small square main castle on the eastern half of the former outer bailey. It had a large tower house, often designated as donjon. 

The tower house was constructed in about 1330, and had walls of 2.10-3 m thick. Part of the northwest and southwest curtain wall were built as about the same time. In the foundations there were some yellow bricks of 30 * 15 * 8 cm, and some of the outside facings were covered in mortar. It all indicated that brick from the round castle had been reused in the foundations of the tower house and some connected walls. The northern tip of the old wall with a loose piece of old foundation probably indicates that the court of the third castle was smaller. The southern tip of the old wall gives the same indication, and showed sure signs of a gate. 

At the time the third castle was constructed there were no stone constructions on the long outer bailey. This was deduced from the differences in the brick that was used, and the configuration of the (later) fortification of the outer bailey. 

Walter II, Lord of Egmond (c. 1283-1321) went on an expedition to Flanders with 60 men in 1315. He might have started the third castle. His son John I, Lord of Egmond (1310-1369) is also a likely candidate. John I was a leader of the Cod faction during the Hook and Cod wars.

Third Castle - Second Building Phase | second half 14th century 

The second construction phase of the third castle took place in the second half of the 14th century. At the small main castle, the northwest and southwest walls were extended to create a larger, but still modest square castle. A new tower on the southeast corner got walls of 1.10 m thick. The brick used in this part measured 27.5-28 * 13.5-14.5 * 6.5-7.5 cm.

The new outer bailey was fortified during this same phase. Its southern, and most of its eastern and western walls are date to the construction phase. The round southwest tower and the square northwest tower were also built during this phase. A single wall fragment of the northwest tower is the only piece of wall still standing today.

The second building phase can be attributed to the growing wealth of the Lords of Egmond. John I, Lord of Egmond (1310-1369) married the rich heiress Gyote van IJsselstein. Arnold I, Lord of Egmond and IJsselstein became rich. He was credited with constructing most of Egmond Castle. For this one can certainly think of the fortification of the outer bailey.

Third Castle - third Building Phase | c. 1450-1525 

During this phase, a great hall was built, probably on the eastern side of the main castle. It held a portrait gallery of the Lords of Egmond. The moat between the main castle and outer-bailey was closed off. On the southern side by a dam with three arcs, on the northern side with two arcs, and some piles below them. Some buildings were also built into the moat from the main castle.

On the outer bailey a large hall for servants was created in the first half of the 16th century. The large gate-building was added in about 1500. With its four towers, it was a fortress on its own. Near the gate building a sand stone lion and two lead dragons were found during the excavation. 

John III of Egmont (1438-1516) was the first Count of Egmont as well as an important statesman in the Burgundian Netherlands. He decided to enlarge and decorate the castle. He was also the last Lord of Egmond to think of Egmond castle as his residence. Many writers called it the largest and most beautiful castle of Holland.

Decline 

As the Egmond family rose to prominence within the Burgundian Netherlands, they spent more and more time in the south of the Netherlands, e.g. in the Egmont Palace in Brussels, the Egmont castle in Zottegem or the castle in La Hamaide.

Lamoraal I, Count of Egmont and first prince of Gavere was the grandson of John III. He was a leading general and statesman in the Spanish Netherlands during the 16th century. His beheading in Brussels in 1568 sparked the national uprising which led to the independence of the Netherlands. Troops led by Diederik Sonoy set both Egmond castle and the abbey on fire in 1573. The destruction was at the command of the Prince of Orange to prevent the Spanish army from occupying these strategic locations.

Ruins 
Count Lamoraal II, son of Lamoraal I, was the last member of the Egmond family who owned the castle. Due to debts, he was forced to sell the castle and the surrounding estates to the States of Holland and West Friesland in 1607, who remained the owner for the remainder of the 17th century. Gerrit van Egmond van Nijenburg, a scion from a younger (bastard) branch of the Egmond family, decided to buy the ruins in 1722. His son, Jan van Egmond van Nijenburg, restored two towers at the entrance of the castle. 

Just like the Ruins of Brederode the ruins of Egmond Castle became a favorite subject of the artists in the Dutch golden age. Painters like Meindert Hobbema and Jacob van Ruisdael or sketchers like Roelant Roghman or Cornelis Pronk depicted the ruins in romantic settings or how they imagined the castle looked like in more glorious times. These paintings are scattered around the world and can be admired in places like the Rijksmuseum in Amsterdam or the Art Institute of Chicago.

Ms Jacoba van Foreest, married with Mr Tinne, became proprietors of the ruins in 1798. They are responsible for the disappearance of the ruins, as they sold it for demolition with the exception of the so-called 'rentmeestertoren' or 'clock tower'. However, in the end, they stopped maintenance and tore it down in 1832. Nothing remained of the castle as from 1836 onwards. The loss of the castle ruins started discussions in the Netherlands around heritage awareness and how to treat monuments. As a result, Brederode castle, the other great ruin in Holland, became one of the first national monuments of the Netherlands.

Excavations 
The province of North Holland became the owner of the castle grounds in 1933, nothing more than a swamp. They immediately started to perform archaeological excavations, which lasted until 1936. Both the fundaments of the first circular and the second square castle were discovered, and not only the exterior walls, but also some of the interior walls. Further, they established that the castle did not have cellars. The decision was made to brick up the walls to raise the fundaments above the grounds. These are the ruins we see today, with some small remainder of the clock tower.

Modern times 
Today, the ruins can freely be visited. A statue has been erected in memory of count Lamoraal I of Egmont in 1997, a copy of the statue stands in the 'Egmont city' Zottegem in Flanders. From time to time, there a discussions to restore (parts of the) castle, but none has been realized.

Gallery

Bibliography 
 A. Beekman: "Het slot op den Hoef", 1961
 Arnold C.M. Burger: Het kasteel van Egmond, Uitgeverij Pirola Schoorl, Schoorl 1988/ 2008
 E.H.P. Cordfunke: "Macht en aanzien", Walburg Pers, Zutphen 2013
 J.W. Groesbeek: "Middeleeuwse kastelen in Noord-Holland", Nederlandse Kastelen Stichting, Rijswijk 1981
 Hans Louis Janssen, Annemieke Kylstra and Ben Olde Meierin: "1000 jaar kastelen in Nederland", Stichting Matrijs, Utrecht 1996
 J. Van Lennep and Hofdijk: "Merkwaardige kastelen in Nederland, deel I", Leiden 1883
 Jaap Renaud: "Hoe heeft het slot te Egmond er uit gezien", in : Elsevier's Geïllustreerd Maandschrift nr 49(1939) nr.98, 1939
 Paul E. van Reyen: "Middeleeuwse kastelen in Nederland", Haarlem 1979
 D. Vis: "De fundamenten van het kasteel te Egmond aan den Hoef", 1938

References

Notes

External links 

 http://www.castles.nl/egmond-castle
 https://huisvanhilde.nl/verhalen/de-ruine-van-het-kasteel-van-egmond/
 https://www.kasteleninnederland.nl/kasteeldetails.php?id=62
 https://www.huysegmont.nl/
 https://www.historischegmond.nl/egmond-aan-den-hoef
 http://www.slotkapel.nl/ Website of the castle chapel

Ruined castles in the Netherlands
Castles in North Holland
Rijksmonuments in North Holland
House of Egmond
Counts of Egmond